The 2009 NBL season was the 28th season of the National Basketball League. Two changes occurred for the 2009 season, with the Christchurch Cougars replacing the Canterbury Rams, and the Otago Nuggets also withdrawing. The Waikato Pistons won the championship in 2009 to claim their fourth league title.

Summary

Regular season standings

Playoff bracket

Awards

Player of the Week

Statistics leaders
Stats as of the end of the regular season

Regular season
 Most Valuable Player: Phill Jones (Nelson Giants)
 NZ Most Valuable Player: Phill Jones (Nelson Giants)
 Most Outstanding Guard: Mike Efevberha (Wellington Saints)
 Most Outstanding NZ Guard: Phill Jones (Nelson Giants)
 Most Outstanding Forward: Thomas Abercrombie (Waikato Pistons)
 Most Outstanding NZ Forward/Centre: Thomas Abercrombie (Waikato Pistons)
 Scoring Champion: Mike Efevberha (Wellington Saints)
 Rebounding Champion: Jamil Terrell (Manawatu Jets)
 Assist Champion: Paul Henare (Christchurch Cougars)
 Rookie of the Year: Thomas Abercrombie (Waikato Pistons)
 Coach of the Year: Dean Vickerman (Waikato Pistons)
 All-Star Five:
 G: Mike Efevberha (Wellington Saints)
 G: Phill Jones (Nelson Giants)
 F: Thomas Abercrombie (Waikato Pistons)
 F: Adam Ballinger (Waikato Pistons)
 C: Tim Behrendorff (Christchurch Cougars)

Playoffs
 Finals MVP: Justin Bailey (Waikato Pistons)

References

External links
Basketball New Zealand 2009 Annual Report
Basketball New Zealand 2009 Results Annual
2009 opening-night rosters
2009 opening-night rosters (more in-depth)
Round 2 Media Guide
Round 3 Media Guide
Round 8 Media Guide
Round 9 Media Guide
Round 10 Media Guide
Round 11 Media Guide
Round 12 Media Guide
Round 13 Media Guide
Round 14 Media Guide
QF Media Guide
2009 playoffs
Finals Preview
Finals Game 1
Finals Game 2

National Basketball League (New Zealand) seasons
NBL